Új Kelet (Hungarian translation: "New East") is a Hungarian-language Zionist Jewish newspaper published first in Kolozsvár (Cluj) in  Transylvania, Romania, and reestablished after an 8-year break in Tel Aviv, Israel in 1948.

Under the initiative of Chaim Weiszburg, a leader of the Zionist movement, Uj Kelet was launched as a weekly on December 19, 1918. It became a daily in 1920. The first editor was Béla Székely, who was succeeded in 1919 by Ernő Marton.

From 1927 until the end of its Transylvanian period, the editor was Ferenc Jámbor. After the Hungarian annexation of Cluj in 1940, the Horthy regime banned the paper because of its strong Zionist leanings. Márton emigrated to Palestine (Eretz Israel) after World War II, and in 1948, the paper reemerged under his editorship with David Schon in Tel Aviv. Among the writers at the newspaper after its reestablishment in Israel were Alexander Sauber, Rudolf Kastner, Yossef Lapid, Ephraim Kishon, Elemer Diamant, David Drori, and Pal Benedek.

From 1993–2015 George Edri was the owner of Új Kelet. Új Kelet is currently the main Hungarian-language independent newspaper in Israel and is published on a monthly basis.

Editor in Chief: Eva Vadasz
Creative Art: Kristof Steiner
Graphic Design: Julia Szasz, Sara Salamon, Lou Kiss
Editors: Istvan J. Bedo, Anna Sebo
Print: Hadfus Hechadash Ltd., Rishon Letzion

Contributors: Arje Singer, Avi ben Giora, Balázs Ibi, Borgula András, Egervári Vera, Frank Peti, Grünhut Éva, Halmos László, Halmos Sándor, Korányi Eszter, Krasznai Éva, Lévai György, Markovits Mária, Markovic Radmila, Dr. Paszternák András, Róna Éva, Schnapp Lea, Steiner Kristóf, Szabó Orsi, Surányi J. András

References

External links
 
 Izraelinfo Website
 
 
 

Jewish newspapers
Newspapers published in Cluj-Napoca
Hungarian-language newspapers
Hungarian-Jewish culture in Israel
Zionism in Europe